Computer Soul is an EP by Black Rain, released on January 18, 2019, by Blackest Ever Black.

Reception
Magnetic Magazine said Computer Soul "explores a timeless world through eerie dub-filled rides, distorted vocals, and gothic trepidation." They listed "Black Mother Kali Gandaki" at number nine of their "Best Ambient and Chill Tracks of January 2019" and said "windswept drones make for a chilly and somber track, fitting the overtone of Black Rain's album."

Track listing

Personnel 
Adapted from the Computer Soul liner notes.

Black Rain
 Stuart Argabright – instruments, production

Production and design
 Matt Colton – mastering

Release history

References

External links 
 
 
 Computer Soul at Bandcamp
 Computer Soul at iTunes

2019 EPs
Black Rain (band) albums